The 2008/09 season of the Algerian Women's Volleyball League  was the 47th annual season of the country's highest volleyball level.

Round 1

|}

Round 2

|}

Round 3

|}

Round 4

|}

Round 5

|}

Round 6

|}

Round 7

|}

Round 8

|}

Round 9

|}

Round 10

|}

Round 11

|}

Round 12

|}

Round 13

|}

Round 14

|}

Awards

References

External links
 Algerian Women's Volleyball League 2008/2009
 Volleyball in Algeria

Volleyball competitions in Algeria
2008 in volleyball
2009 in volleyball
2008 in Algerian sport
2009 in Algerian sport
Women's volleyball in Algeria